Raphidiophryidae is a family of mostly freshwater centrohelids. It is the sister family of Acanthocystidae, sharing the trait of presenting silica scales and comprising the clade Chalarothoracina. Two genera, Raphidiophrys and Polyplacocystis, have been discovered so far.

References

Haptista
Eukaryote families